Avroman or Hawraman, is a mountainous region located within the provinces of Kurdistan and Kermanshah in western Iran and in north-eastern Kurdistan Region in Iraq. The main part of the Hawraman region is located in Iran and encompasses two components of the Central-Eastern Valley (Zhawaro and Takht, in Kurdistan Province); and the Western Valley (Lahon, in Kermanshah Province). The mode of human habitation in these two valleys has been adapted over millennia to the rough mountainous environment. Tiered steep-slope planning and architecture, gardening on dry-stone terraces, livestock breeding, and seasonal vertical migration are among the distinctive features of the local culture and life of the Hawrami Kurdish people who dwell in lowlands and highlands during different seasons of each year. On July 27, 2021, part of the Hawraman region along with Uramanat were inscribed on the UNESCO World Heritage List as a cultural site under the name "Cultural Landscape of Hawraman/Uramanat".

The word hawraman is formed of two parts ‘Hawra’ means ‘Ahoora’ and ‘Man’ means ‘house, position’. Hawraman is the region of Ahooramzda. ‘howr’ in Avesta means sun, in this case Hawraman would be translated as ‘Territory of Sun’.

“Oraman Takht” village is located in the center of Oraman district in the southwest of Kurdistan province and "Pir Shaliar" ceremony is held there every year. According to the people belief, Hawraman has been a large city and had a prominent centrality, because of that it has been called the throne or the center of government, and the ancient Iranian religions are in the historical memory of the ancestors of the people of this region and are preserved; and still the historical memories of people arising from the ancestors bear the historical rituals and it is strongly revered. Language, culture, and conventions of people express this ancient history. In this region, Zartoshti religion used to be taught before Islamic era. The language was derived from Sasanid Pahlavi .>

Avroman has many springs and rivers that most their water mainly flows into Sirwan River. Bil spring (or Kani Bil) is one of these springs which has a discharge about 3000-4000 liters per second. The river which is made of Bil spring is the shortest river in the world with a total length of 15 meters. Construction of Darian Dam on the Sirwan River between 2009 and 2015 initiated The Darian Dam Archaeological Salvage Program that led to discovery of many archaeological sites before flooding of the reservoir.

Archaeology and history

Prehistoric periods

 
The earliest archaeological evidence shows that the region was inhabited by humans since Middle Paleolithic Period (more than 40,000 years ago). This evidence was discovered by archaeologists near Hajij village and between Naw and Asparez villages in the Sirwan valley. These earliest finds include stone tools that made by Neanderthals or Early Modern Humans. Evidence for Late Paleolithic occupation discovered in a cave site called Kenacheh in the Perdi Mala valley.
These archaeological finds were unearthed during Darian Dam Archaeological Salvage Program  that conducted several seasons of archaeological surveys and excavations within the area of the reservoir that led to the discovery of a number of important Paleolithic and more later sites. The Main excavated sites were Dārāi Rockshelter (Middle Paleolithic), Kenācheh Cave (Upper Paleolithic), Ruwār tomb (Iron Age), Sar Cham (Chalcolithic and Iron Age), and Barda Mār (19th century). Except for Ruwar sites, all other excavated sites were flooded in 2015-2016.
Several Paleolithic sites have been recorded in the south of Hawraman where Paleolithic hunters used two rock shelters for seasonal or short-term habitation near the villages of Shamshir and Zardui during a period that archaeologists call Middle Paleolithic.(Arkeonews)

Historic periods

The Inscription of Sargon II at Tang-i Var pass near the village of Tang-i Var, indicates that the region was occupied by Assyrians during their military campaigns into Zagros. This Royal Inscription belongs to Sargon II, King of Assyria (721–705 BC).

The Parchments of Avroman, a set of three documents from the Seleucid and Parthian eras, were found in the region in 1909. They were discovered in a cave on Kuh-e Salan Mountain, near the village of Shar Hawraman, and subsequently sent to London. The documents date from 88/87 BC to 33 AD, with two written in Greek and one in Parthian. They document the sale of a vineyard and another land, and include the names of Pātaspak, son of Tīrēn and Awīl, son of Baænīn.

Ancient religions are also practiced throughout Avroman and the region is home to the ancient holy places of the Yarsan faith. Some scholars believe that the name Hawraman or Huraman has strong connections to the ancient Zoroastrian faith and claim that the name may have originated from Ahuraman or Ahura Mazda.  Ahura Mazda is the name of God in the ancient Indo-Iranian Avestan language and comes from the ancient Zoroastrian faith, which is still being practiced by very small numbers of people in the region. Many areas in the Avroman region are believed to have been pilgrimage sites for Zoroastrians prior to the advent of Islam. One of the oldest Islamic period evidence is Negel quran. A leather-bound Quran written in the Kufic script with gilded page borders, dates to 4th century AH (913 CE – 1009 CE) which is kept in a mosque in the Negel village.

Culture

The inhabitants of Avroman are Kurdish people, who speak the Hawrami dialect of the Gorani language. Traditional clothing for women includes either a vest or long-sleeved jacket or long overcoat worn over a gown. An under dress and puffy pants is worn beneath the gown. Traditionally women wore Kurdish hats ornamented with valued coloured stones, beads and gold pieces. Usually younger women and young girls wear brightly coloured dresses adorned with many beads and sequins and the older women wear darker colours and white head-cover. Hawrami men generally wear a shirt; a vest with an open neck; and baggy trousers fitted at the ankles. A cotton sash 3–4 m long is folded in half lengthwise and wrapped tightly around the torso on waist. Men also wore traditional brown felt jackets with pointed shoulders called Kolabal.

Siyaw Chemane is a style of singing practiced by the Kurds in Avroman people and means dark eyes in Hewrami. It is performed without the use of any instruments, with the exception of the occasional use of a Kurdish hand-drum or Daff. Today, the Siya Cheman style is used mostly for storytelling and entertainment.

Wildlife
Hawraman is home to divers fauna, including the Persian leopard (Panthera pardus tulliana), brown bear (Ursus arctos), mouflon (Ovis orientalis orientalis), wolf (Canis lupus), and Wild goat (Capra aegrarus) that can be found throughout the region. Buzin and Markhil Protected Area (Kurdish: بوزین و مارخێڵ) is located at the southwest of Hawraman in Paveh and Javanrud counties of Kermanshah province. Hunting and shooting is prohibited and in 1999, it was registered as a protected area.

Cultural Landscape of Uramanat
Cultural Landscape of Hawraman or Cultural Landscape of Uramanat is the 26th tangible cultural heritage of Iran.The property is located in the provinces of Kurdistan and Kermanshah along the western border of Iran.

The Uramanat Villages are located in the mountainous Kermanshah and Kurdistan Provinces of Iran and Halabja Governorate of Iraqi Kurdistan. The villages are unique in terms of architecture, lifestyle, and agricultural methodology.  Villages are integrated with nature by incorporating steep-slope agriculture. The 12 villages included in the property illustrate the Hawrami people's evolving responses to the scarcity of productive land in their mountainous environment through the millennia. On July 28, 2021,

This site was first added to the UNESCO World Heritage Tentative List on August 9, 2007. On July 27, 2021, it along with part of the Hawraman region were officially inscribed on the World Heritage List as a cultural site under the name "Cultural Landscape of Hawraman/Uramanat".

Hawraman Cultural Landscape was inscribed on the UNESCO World Heritage List as the 26th tangible cultural heritage of Iran at the 44th session of the UNESCO World Heritage Committee.

References

Gallery

External links
 Omid Sālehi, Customs of the Land of Stone and Wind (Ā'in-e Sar'zamin-e Sang va Bād), in Persian, Jadid Online, 5 May 2009, .Audio slideshow:  (5 min 39 sec).Note: The place shown in the above audio slideshow is Orāmān, to the North of Pāveh. As of today (May 2009), this place has a population of approximately 3500.

Regions of Iraq
 
Regions of Iran
Geography of Iraq
Geography of Kurdistan Province
Geography of Kermanshah Province
Geography of Kurdistan
World Heritage Sites in Iran